Joachim Müller (born 25 March 1961) is a retired German football defender.

References

1961 births
Living people
German footballers
Stuttgarter Kickers players
Kickers Offenbach players
2. Bundesliga players
Association football defenders